Mark Hanretty (born 21 March 1985) is a Scottish former competitive ice dancer who represented the United Kingdom with Christina Chitwood. They are two-time (2008, 2010) British medalists and competed at the 2009 European Championships, placing 18th and 2010 World championships in Turin.

Competitive career
Hanretty began figure skating in 1995. As a single skater, he was coached by John Christie and Diane C. Dewar in Edinburgh and East Kilbride. He switched to ice dancing in 2004. He competed briefly with Lauren Bradshaw.

Hanretty and American ice dancer Christina Chitwood decided to team up on 31 December 2005 and began training together properly in May 2006. Their training was disrupted by Chitwood's contraction of mononucleosis (glandular fever). They made their debut in January 2007 at the British Championships at the National Ice Centre in Nottingham, England, finishing in 7th place.

Chitwood/Hanretty won bronze at the 2008 British Championships at IceSheffield in Sheffield in January 2008. In the summer of 2008, they were selected by the National Ice Skating Association (NISA) to join the Great Britain Squad (also known as Team Skate G.B.). This enabled them to represent Great Britain in elite international competitions. In September 2008, Chitwood/Hanretty made their international debut at the 2008 Nebelhorn Trophy in Oberstdorf, Germany, where they placed 10th. In November of that same year, they won the bronze medal in their second international competition, the Pavel Roman Memorial in Olomouc, Czech Republic.

Chitwood/Hanretty placed 4th at the 2009 British Championships at the National Ice Centre in Nottingham, in January 2009. However, their international success earlier in the season enabled them to qualify for the 2009 European Championships in Helsinki, Finland. At the event, they competed alongside the first-ranked British team, Sinead Kerr / John Kerr, and finished 18th.

In autumn 2009, Chitwood/Hanretty placed 8th at the 2009 Nebelhorn Trophy in Oberstdorf, Germany, fourth at the Ice Challenge in Graz, Austria, third at the 2009 NRW Trophy in Dortmund, Germany, and fourth at the Mont Blanc Trophy in Courmayeur, Italy. In November 2009, Chitwood/Hanretty won the bronze medal at the 2010 British Championships at IceSheffield in Sheffield. They were ranked third overall in the 2009–10 NISA National Rankings, based on the personal best scores achieved during the 2009–2010 season. They retired from competition in 2010.

Chitwood/Hanretty received funding from the Lloyds TSB Local Heroes initiative.

Later career
In 2011 and 2012, Hanretty appeared on ITV's Dancing on Ice. He was partnered with Nadia Sawalha in series 6 in 2011. They were voted out early along with Angela Rippon and Sean Rice. In series 7 in 2012, Hanretty was partnered with Rosemary Conley. They were the 6th couple eliminated. Hanretty skated with Oona King in series 8 in 2013. On 20 January 2013, he dislocated his shoulder as he was about to perform the survival skate but a doctor moved it back into place and the couple completed the performance. They were eliminated at the end of the show.

On 21 November 2017,  it was confirmed that Hanretty would return to Dancing on Ice when the show returned for its tenth series in January 2018. His partner was Donna Air. In 2019, he was partnered with Saira Khan, and 2020, he was partnered with Libby Clegg. In 2021, he was paired with Billie Shepherd. They had to withdraw from the competition in Week 4, due to Billie sustaining a head injury during training. For the 2022 season he was paired with Kimberly Wyatt.

In 2012, Hanretty won the Young Artists Showcase, a choreography competition in the United States. He works as a coach and choreographer, based mainly in Sheffield, England.

Personal life
Hanretty was born in Erskine, near Glasgow in Scotland. He lives with his wife, Kathy – a skating coach – in Nottinghamshire. Their son, Lukasz, was born 2 February 2013.

Programs
(with Chitwood)

Competitive highlights
(with Christina Chitwood)

(with Lauren Bradshaw)

Detailed competitive results
(with Christina Chitwood)

References

External links

 Official site for Mark Hanretty

 Lloyds TSB Local Heroes
 Official site for Chitwood and Hanretty

Scottish male ice dancers
Living people
Sportspeople from Glasgow
1985 births
Figure skating commentators